James L. Smallwood (1845–1885) was an American educator and barber who was born in Mulberry Ward, Philadelphia. Smallwood was both the first African American juror in York County, Pennsylvania, and was the founder of the James Smallwood Schoolhouse in York, Pennsylvania. Smallwood was also one of the original charter members of Lebanon Cemetery in York, PA. Smallwood died on November 3, 1885. due to paralysis. James L. Smallwood was also an active member of the African Methodist Episcopal Zion Church.

Early life and education 
Born in 1845 in Mulberry Ward, Philadelphia to mother Lydia Smallwood, James L. Smallwood grew up with two sisters and three brothers. He had five siblings: sisters Lydia Smallwood, Mary A.C. Smallwood Gray, and three brothers. One of the brothers was a private secretary of former Supreme Court Justice Salmon P. Chase.

Smallwood attended the Institute of Colored Youth and graduated in 1864.

Career and life 

Smallwood was one of the original charter members of Lebanon Cemetery, located in North York, Pennsylvania. Due to cemeteries in York originally only allowing Whites to be buried there, cemeteries for African Americans and other people of color were located outside of the city.

Smallwood was a member of the African Methodist Episcopal Zion Church. Smallwood worked with the church on multiple occasions including speaking at the celebration of the 16th anniversary of the organization that ran Sunday school for the church. In addition, Smallwood also ran events such as performances by young church members

He was the first African American juror in York County, Pennsylvania. The case was Chambers v Hess (1878), with the charge Fornication & Bastardy. The Defendant (Milton Chambers) was ultimately found guilty.

James L. Smallwood Schoolhouse
Smallwood became an educator in 1867 at a segregated school in York, Pennsylvania. In 1871, Smallwood had opened the first school for African Americans in York. It is now known as the James L. Smallwood Schoolhouse. The school was founded through a partnership with the local chapter of the African Methodist Episcopal Zion Church. Smallwood often received praise for his work as a successful educator in his field, and for the work that his students and school did. The School was located in several different locations ranging from a room in the local chapter of the African Methodist Episcopal Zion Church, to eventually the last building being opened in 1892, seven years after James Smallwood's death. The building was named in memory of Professor James Smallwood. The last building was located near the intersection of S. Pershing Avenue and W. College Street in York, and it stayed open until the 1960's when York City schools were desegregated.

Historical Marker 
The site of where the school was located was deemed a historical site in Pennsylvania on May 4, 2002. It is located near the intersection of S. Pershing Ave. and W. College Ave.  The marker has text saying: "Built in 1892, this school was part of a movement to create schools for the education of black students by black teachers, and is representative of the national struggle for equal education, regardless of race. Named in memory of James Smallwood, elected teacher of the city's first 'colored school' in 1871."

References 

1845 births
People from Philadelphia
People from York, Pennsylvania
African-American schoolteachers
Schoolteachers from Pennsylvania
American school principals
Founders of schools in the United States
1885 deaths
Deaths in Pennsylvania
Burials in Pennsylvania
Neurological disease deaths in Pennsylvania
African-American Methodists
Cheyney University of Pennsylvania alumni
African-American history of Pennsylvania